Spinal Cord Injury BC (SCI BC) is a not-for-profit organization that helps people with spinal cord injuries and related injuries adjust, adapt and thrive by providing answers, information and community experiences in the Canadian province of British Columbia.

Spinal Cord Injury BC has three core services through which it serves the BC Spinal Cord Injury community, the Peer program, Information Services and SCI Information Database.

Spinal Cord Injury BC works in close partnership with the Vancouver General Hospital, GF Strong Rehabilitation Centre, International Collaboration On Repair Discoveries (ICORD), Rick Hansen Institute, Neil Squire Foundation, BC Wheelchair Sports (BCWCS) and The Disability Foundation.

History 

Spinal Cord Injury BC ( formerly the BC Paraplegic Association) is a branch of the Canadian Paraplegic Association(CPA). The CPA was founded in 1945 by veterans who sustained spinal cord injuries in WW II; its mandate was to minimize social barriers faced by persons with disabilities so that they could benefit from an improved quality of life.

The Canadian Paraplegic Association, BC Division (now known as Spinal Cord Injury BC) was formed in 1957, led by executive director Doug Mowat, who held this position until his death in 1992.

The first unit of the Western Society for Physical Rehabilitation opened in 1947 and was renamed the GF Strong Rehabilitation Centre in 1957.

In 1959, the association's first employee was hired as a rehabilitation consultant. That same year, the BC Paraplegic Association celebrated its first job placement.

During the 1960s, scholarships were made available to assist individuals with physical disabilities in reaching their post-secondary education goals. The BC Paraplegic Association also helped contributed to worldwide disability education and development in 1969 with its donation of equipment to people with disabilities in developing countries.

Strong promotion by the BC Paraplegic Association to revise the BC Building Code and eliminate stairs as the only means of access to public buildings proved successful in 1973, when the City of Vancouver introduced its new accessibility by-laws. These standards were expanded throughout the province under the BC Building Code in 1979.

The BC Paraplegic Foundation was established in 1975 to support the BC Paraplegic Association and individuals with spinal cord injuries and other mobility-related impairments.

The BC Paraplegic Association also extensively consulted in the planning of Vancouver's Expo '86 which was lauded as a showcase for accessibility and high-tech innovations for people with disabilities.

In the 1990s, the association worked with BC Transit and were instrumental in the development of the accessible bus program in the Lower Mainland – the first of its kind in Canada.

Staff

Doug Mowat, the organization's longtime executive director, was also the first wheelchair user ever elected to the Legislative Assembly of British Columbia as an MLA.

The organization's most recent director of marketing and development, Stephanie Cadieux, was elected to the Legislative Assembly as a BC Liberal MLA in the 2009 provincial election, becoming the second wheelchair user ever elected to the legislature.

References

External links
 BC Paraplegic Association

Non-profit organizations based in Vancouver
Health charities in Canada